Attila Orbán is a Hungarian professional ice hockey player currently playing for Dunaújvárosi Acélbikák in the Erste Liga. He is also member of the Hungarian national ice hockey team.

References

External links 

1990 births
Living people
Fehérvár AV19 players
Hungarian ice hockey defencemen